USS Wyandance (SP-359) was a patrol boat that served in the United States Navy from 1917 to 1918.
 
Wyandance was built as a private motorboat of the same name in 1905 by the Electric Boat Company at Bayonne, New Jersey. On 19 June 1917, the U.S. Navy acquired her from her owner, Mr. M. S. Burrill of Jericho, Long Island, New York, for use as a patrol boat during World War I. She was commissioned as USS Wyandance (SP-359) on 24 August 1917 at New York City.

Assigned to the 3rd Naval District, Wyandance served on section patrol duties in the New York City area for about five months.

Wyandance was decommissioned early in 1918. The Navy returned her to her owner on 2 February 1918, and she was stricken from the Navy Directory the same day.

References

NavSource Online: Section Patrol Craft Photo Archive: Wyandance (SP 359)

Patrol vessels of the United States Navy
World War I patrol vessels of the United States
Ships built in Bayonne, New Jersey
1905 ships